Qaleh-ye Qarah Jalar (also Romanized as Qal‘eh-ye Qarah Jalar; also known as Qarah Jelow and Qareh Jalar) is a village in Jafarbay-ye Sharqi Rural District, Gomishan District, Torkaman County, Golestan Province, Iran. At the 2006 census, its population was 237, in 59 families.

References 

Populated places in Torkaman County